Aurélien Duval (born 29 June 1988) is a French former professional cyclist. He ended his career during the 2013 season, after failing to find a team.

Major results

Cyclo-cross

2005–2006
 1st  National Junior Championships
2006–2007
 2nd National Under-23 Championships
 Challenge La France Under-23
2nd Hénin-Beaumont
2007–2008
 1st  National Under-23 Championships
 Challenge La France Under-23
1st Quelneuc
2nd Sarrebourg
2nd Cap d'Agde
 2nd  UCI Under-23 World Championships
 2nd Overall UCI Under-23 World Cup
2nd Liévin
3rd Hoogerheide
2008–2009
 2nd  UEC European Under-23 Championships
 2nd Overall UCI Under-23 World Cup
2nd Roubaix
2nd Tábor
3rd Heusden-Zolder
2011–2012
 1st  National Championships
 1st Secheval
 1st Nohan
 1st Eteignére

Road
2006
 1st Stage 1 Liège–La Gleize (TTT])
 2nd Road race, National Junior Road Championships
2007
 4th Road race, National Under-23 Road Championships
2008
 2nd Flèche Ardennaise
 3rd Grand Prix des Marbriers
 7th Overall Giro delle Regioni

References

External links

1988 births
Living people
French male cyclists
People from Sedan, Ardennes
Cyclo-cross cyclists
Cyclists from Grand Est
Sportspeople from Ardennes (department)